Geran Tarr (born in Akron, Ohio) is an American politician who served as a Democratic member of the Alaska House of Representatives for the 17th district from 2013 to 2023.

Early life and education
Tarr was born in Akron, Ohio. She earned her BS in from Ohio University Ohio in botany, environmental studies, and women's studies. She then went on to earn her master's degree at the University of Alaska Anchorage in public administration with a policy analysis focus.

Elections
2012 When Republican Representative Anna Fairclough ran for the District M senate seat and left the District 17 seat open, Tarr won the August 28, 2012 Democratic Primary with 600 votes (55.56%), and won the November 6, 2012 General election with 2,416 votes (60.31%) against Republican nominee Cean Stevens.

References

External links
 Official page at the Alaska Legislature
 Geran Tarr at 100 Years of Alaska's Legislature

Year of birth missing (living people)
Living people
Democratic Party members of the Alaska House of Representatives
Ohio University alumni
Politicians from Akron, Ohio
Women state legislators in Alaska
21st-century American politicians
21st-century American women politicians